Anett Pötzsch (later Witt, now Rauschenbach, born 3 September 1960) is a German former figure skater. She is the 1980 Olympic champion, two-time World champion (1978, 1980), four-time European champion (1977–1980), and five-time East German champion (1976–1980).

Career
Pötzsch represented the GDR (East Germany) in the ladies events at international championships. Her first coach was Brigitte Schellhorn. After Pötzsch was admitted into a sports academy, Gabriele Seyfert was assigned as her coach and later, Seyfert's mother, Jutta Müller, took over coaching duties. She was the Olympic Champion in 1980 and world champion in 1978 and 1980. She also won the European title four times, from 1977 to 1980; and the East German title five times, from 1976 to 1980. In 1981, she announced her retirement, saying in 2011, "I had knee problems and I was not motivated because I had reached all my goals" but she said she later regretted her decision.

Pötzsch was a judge at international skating events in the late 1980s but the ISU banned her after she appeared in Skates of Gold shows and Katarina Witt's film, Carmen. The ISU restored her eligibility in 1994, along with that of professional skaters. In the 1990s, Pötzsch worked at a bank but quit her job in 1999 in order to coach. She coaches in Chemnitz, Germany, and in 2004 became an ISU technical specialist. Her students include Daniel Dotzauer, the 2010 German Championships bronze medalist, and Sandy Hoffmann.

Personal life 
Pötzsch was born in Karl-Marx-Stadt, GDR (today renamed Chemnitz, Germany). She married Axel Witt, the brother of fellow German figure skater Katarina Witt, but the couple divorced in 1990. Their daughter, Claudia Rauschenbach, born in 1984, is the 2000 German pair skating champion with Robin Szolkowy. In 1993, Pötzsch married Axel Rauschenbach, who is the father of her second daughter, Cindy, and stepfather to Claudia.

Results

References

 Anett Potzsch at Sports Reference
 various old news papers
 personal interview

German female single skaters
Figure skaters at the 1976 Winter Olympics
Figure skaters at the 1980 Winter Olympics
International Skating Union technical specialists
Olympic figure skaters of East Germany
Olympic gold medalists for East Germany
Sportspeople from Chemnitz
1960 births
Living people
Olympic medalists in figure skating
World Figure Skating Championships medalists
European Figure Skating Championships medalists
Medalists at the 1980 Winter Olympics